Parise is a surname of Italian origin. Notable people with this name include:

 Eddy Parise, bass player for the Australian band Baby Animals
 Goffredo Parise, Italian journalist
 J. P. Parisé, (1941–2015) Canadian ice hockey player
 Jordan Parise, American ice hockey player
 Ronald A. Parise, American scientist and astronaut
 Sara Parise, Italian swimmer
 Vanessa Parise, film director
 Zach Parise, American hockey player

See also 
 Parisse, a surname